Scott F. Verbeck (October 1860 – February 12, 1939) was a member of the Wisconsin State Assembly.

Biography
Verbeck was born in Columbia County, Wisconsin in 1860. He died of a heart attack in Mazomanie, Wisconsin in 1939, leaving a widow, one son, three daughters, and an estate worth $10,500.

Career
Verbeck was elected to the Assembly in 1902. He was a Republican.

References

External links

The Political Graveyard

People from Columbia County, Wisconsin
Republican Party members of the Wisconsin State Assembly
1860 births
1939 deaths